Clostera anachoreta, the scarce chocolate-tip, is a moth of the family Notodontidae. The species was first described by Michael Denis and Ignaz Schiffermüller in 1775. It is found from Europe up to Japan and Korea.

The wingspan is about 37 mm. The moth flies from April to August in two generations depending on the location.

The larvae feed on Populus and Salix species.

Gallery

Sources 
 P.C.-Rougeot, P. Viette (1978). Guide des papillons nocturnes d'Europe et d'Afrique du Nord. Delachaux et Niestlé (Lausanne).

External links

Fauna Europaea
Lepiforum e.V.
De Vlinderstichting 

Notodontidae
Moths of Korea
Moths of Japan
Moths of Europe
Moths of Asia
Moths described in 1775
Taxa named by Michael Denis
Taxa named by Ignaz Schiffermüller